Vitali Klitschko vs. Odlanier Solis was a heavyweight fight for the WBC heavyweight title. The fight was official confirmed on January 11. It took place on March 19, 2011. The location for the fight was Lanxess Arena, Cologne, Nordrhein-Westfalen, Germany.

Background
Odlanier Solis became the mandatory heavyweight challenger for the WBC heavyweight title, after a 10-round DQ win against Ray Austin on December 17, 2010.
The negotiations started out difficult. In the beginning, Odlanier Solis started out by demanding 1.5 million Euro for the fight.
On January 11, it was official confirmed that the fight between Vitali Klitschko and Odlanier Solis was going to take place in Cologne, Germany on March 19, 2011.
It was reported that Odlanier Solis earned 1.8 million US dollar for the fight, which is 1.4 million Euro. Vitali earned 15 million US dollars.

In Germany, the fight was broadcast live and exclusively on RTL Television.

The first press conference of the fight was officially held in Cologne and both fighters and managers attended the press conference.
At the press conference, neither fighter or promoter etc. spoke English, as there was no need to. Odlanier Solis does not speak English and Vitali Klitschko had no need to as the press conference and fight is in Germany.
There had been some trash talk up to the fight. Odlanier Solis has accused Vitali Klitschko for spreading rumors about him, that he is lazy, because of how he trains. Solis said that he is in perfect shape and ready to defeat Klitschko.
Vitali Klitschko on the other hand said that he will get rid of Odlanier Solis from the boxing world, after Solis has stated several times that he will defeat Klitschko, end his reign and send him to retirement.
Vitali Klitschko had earlier said that he had fought some strong opponents, but never an Olympic gold medalist. (Which is false, as he faced Lennox Lewis, who is a former Olympic Gold Medalist).
He also said that he expected a tough and close fight against a young and talented fighter. Solis' manager Ahmet Öner had also accused Vitali Klitschko for avoiding this fight for a long time.
The second press conference was held on March 14 in Cologne. The press conference was quiet and there were no trash talk at the conference, although they both promised a knockout.

Fight
Ticket sales for the fight started on January 26 on www.eventim.de. The prices for the fight started at €25.
The official weigh-in for the fight took place in Cologne, Germany, on March 18. It took place at Karstadt Sport Breite Straße. The official weight for the two fighters was as follows: Vitali Klitschko weighed in at 249.5 lbs., while Odlanier Solis weighed in at 247 lbs.

Before the fight, there was also a public work-out. It was held on March 16 at the Mercedes-Benz Center in Cologne. Both camps came and showed themselves for the press and public.
The supervisor for the fight was Charles Giles. The commissioner for the fight was the Bund Deutscher Berufsboxer and Tom Loeffler (K2 Promotions) was the promoter.

Vitali Klitschko defeated Odlanier Solis in the first round. Solis went down near the end of the opening round, getting hit by a right hook to the temple. He immediately began grabbing his right knee upon attempting to get to his feet. He was able to make it to his feet. At that, the referee waved an end to the bout.

Aftermath
After the fight, Solis was brought to Cologne's University Hospital, where it was confirmed that Solis suffered from a legitimate and serious knee injury. It was known that Solis had torn his cruciate ligament and damaged cartilage in the fall.

Solis promoter Ahmet Öner yelled and was very angry and frustrated after the fight.
He showed up at the post-fight press conference, but only to give his opinion about Vitali Klitschko's manager, Bernard Bönte, whom he yelled and screamed at.
Vitali Klitschko retained his WBC heavyweight title against Tomasz Adamek on 10 September 2011 in Poland, winning by TKO in the 10th round. The referee stopped the bout after Adamek received punishing blows and was ruled out as he was no longer able to defend himself.
Odlanier Solis was set to make his comeback on November 25, 2011 in Trabzon, Turkey, but due to issues he was not able to leave the United States and his fight was taken off the card.
On December 12, 2011, it was confirmed that Derek Chisora would be Vitali Klitschko's next opponent.

International broadcasting

References

External links
Klitschko vs. Solis Official Fight Card from BoxRec

World Boxing Council heavyweight championship matches
2011 in boxing
Boxing in Germany
Sport in Cologne
2011 in German sport
Klitschko brothers
March 2011 sports events in Europe
Boxing matches